Subiksha Krishnan is an Indian actress. She has starred in predominately Tamil films apart from a few Malayalam and Kannada language films.

Career

Film work 
Subiksha made her acting debut in Bharathiraja's 2013 Tamil film Annakodi, in which she portrayed the wife of the hero. The same year, she had her first starring role in her maiden Malayalam film Olipporu, as heroine of Fahadh Faasil. She played the role of an IT professional in the film. Her debut Kannada film Anjada Gandu got released in 2014, which is a remake of Sivakarthikeyan's Tamil film Manam Kothi Paravai, in which she was paired opposite Sathish Ninasam. She played a traditional village girl, Geetha Gowda.

In 2017, the Tamil movie Kadugu was released, in which she was paired opposite Bharath, directed by cinematographer, director Vijay Milton, produced by Rough Note Production and released by 2D Entertainment. Subiksha got recognition after Kadugus release. Again she worked with the same director Vijay Milton in the movie Goli Soda 2 in 2018, her character name is Innocent Inba.

Filmography

References

External links
 

Actresses in Malayalam cinema
Actresses in Tamil cinema
Actresses in Telugu cinema
People from Bellary
Indian film actresses
20th-century Indian actresses
21st-century Indian actresses
Actresses from Karnataka
Actresses in Kannada cinema
Year of birth missing (living people)